This is a list of Italian television related events from 1956.

Events 

 RAI extends television broadcasting to 6 hours by day, and 11 hours on Sunday.
 3 February. With the first airing of Carosello, (see below) advertising is introduced to Italian television. The show is inaugurated by an educational short about car driving, sponsored by Shell and played by the sports journalist Giovanni Canestrini. 
25 March: RAI broadcasts on Eurovision the signing of the Treaty of Rome.
 16 May. Foundation of TVL (Televisione Libera), presided by Gian Vittorio Figari, which aimed to create a commercial television in Milan. Involved in In this project were the American William A. Berns, manager of RCA and NBC, and the controversial businessman Umberto Ortolani. The firm performs (illegally) the first test broadcastings by an Italian private television, on the UHF band, which was not used by RAI.
 8 September. In the encyclical Miranda prorsus, Pope Pius XII expresses the Catholic Church’s views regarding to modern mass media. About television, the Pope shows interest but also concern. He asks for a strict control by the civil authorities on its content.  
 19 December. In Rome, RAI inaugurates the Via Teulada Production Center, with 6 studios; the core of the firm moves definitively from Turin to the capital.

Debuts 

 Carosello (Carousel) – advertising show, aired daily between the news and the prime time; it consists of a series of two minutes film (usually comical sketches or cartoons), ending with the slogan of the sponsor, and often realized anonymously by renowned directors, as Luciano Emmer and Ermanno Olmi.  For twenty years, it’s one of the TV show most loved by the public (moreover by the childish one) and sees the presence as testimonials of almost all the most famous Italian showmen, from Eduardo De Filippo to Dario Fo.
 Telematch – game show, hosted by Enzo Tortora, Silvio Noto and Renato Tagliani; two seasons. It includes, for the first time in Italy, two segments not shot in studio: The mysterious object, from the square of a village, and The arm and the mind, cultural and athletic test from a gym, with the presence of famous sportsmen.
 Il musichiere – musical game show, Italian version of Name that tune; directed by Antonello Falqui, written by Garinei and Giovannini, hosted by Mario Riva. The program gets huge popularity, not only for the game but also for the presence as guest stars of the biggest names of the show business and of the sport, not only Italians, from Gary Cooper to Coppi and Bartali.  After three seasons, the show is deleted because the sudden Mario Riva’s death.  
 Zurich festival of the Italian song; 11 editions.

Television shows 

 Volti e voci della fortuna (Faces and voices of the luck) – musical contest bound to the New Year lottery, hosted by Enzo Tortora and Silvio Noto, won by Aurelio Fierro with Scapricciatello. It’s considered an early version of Canzonissima (also if a similar show had been already aired, only by radio, in 1956, under the title Le canzoni della fortuna, The luck’s song).
 Viaggio nella valle del Po : alla ricerca di cibi genuini (Trip in the Po Valley: looking for genuine foods) – gastronomical reportage in 12 episodes, directed and hosted by Mario Soldati. While the Italian intellectuals flaunt, generally, distrust for the television, Soldati shows the potentialities of the new media, using the cuisine as a way to investigate the rural Italy.
 Othello – traduced by Salvatore Quasimodo and directed by Claudio Fino, with Vittorio Gassmann, Salvo Randone and Anna Maria Ferrero.

Period dramas 

 Orgoglio e pregiudizio (Pride and prejudice) by Daniele D’Anza, from the Jane Austen’s novel, in five chapters; with Virna Lisi, on her TV debut (Lizzie Bennet), Franco Volpi (Darcy), Enrico Maria Salerno (Wickham) and Sergio Tofano (Mr. Bennet).
 Jane Eyre by Anton Giulio Majano, from the Charlotte Bronte’s novel, in five chapters; with Ilaria Occhini (Jane Eyre) and Raf Vallone (Rochester).
 Piccolo mondo antico (The little world of the Past), by Silverio Biasi, from the Antonio Fogazzaro’s novel, in five chapters; with Paola Borboni, Carla Del Poggio and Renato De Carmine. First RAI period drama from an Italian novel.
 Romanzo di un giovane povero (Story of a poor young man) by Silverio Blasi, from the Octave Feuillet’s novel about the ordeal of a young decayed nobleman, in four chapters; with Paolo Carlini and Lea Padovani. 
 Tessa la ninfa fedele (The constant nymph) by Mario Ferrero, from the Margaret Kennedy’s novel about the tragic love between a musician and a lassie, in four chapters; with Alberto Lupo and Elena Cotta.

References